Huspek is a surname. Notable people with the surname include:

Felix Huspek (born 1992), Austrian footballer
Philipp Huspek (born 1991), Austrian footballer